Modunga is a monotypic moth genus of the family Erebidae. Its only species, Modunga palpigera, is known from Borneo. Both the genus and the species were first described by Francis Walker in 1863.

References

External links
 

Hypeninae
Monotypic moth genera